Psematismenos is a village in the Larnaca District of Cyprus, located 2 km northwest of Maroni.

History

It has been a settlement since Middle Bronze Age.

References

Communities in Larnaca District